Jamie Allan is a United Kingdom-based magician. He is known for the fusion of magic and technology. Jamie Allan performs modern illusions with iPads, Laser Beams, Facebook and Twitter. He has appeared on various TV shows and has worked alongside various other entertainers and performers and designed illusions and effects for them. He has also worked in many aspects of the entertainment industry, as performer, producer, writer and director. He is Creator and Co-Writer of the musical Houdini.

Biography
Jamie Allan was born on 15 February 1977 in England to Alan James Nicklin and Kay Kennedy. His father was the leader of the show band Second City Sound and Touch of Velvet. His mother was a popular singer. He has two sons Joshua James Nicklin Allen and Jasper James Nicklin Allen.

Professional life
Jamie performed his first magic show at just 8 years old in Cabaret Club in Market Bosworth.

Since then he has performed worldwide on major TV  shows and theatres including headlining London Palladium. He has designed special effects and stage illusions for many top stars in the entertainment and corporate worlds, including making the new Mercedes M class appear from thin air at the UK launch, designing the patent pending laser technology for the new show Lumina the Laser Violinist and even vanishing and reproducing a $250,000 Robinson R22 Helicopter live on the stage of the RMS Queen Mary 2 during her maiden voyage. He has designed stage illusions for performers and entertainers like Sting, Tim Minchin, Katherine Jenkins, Lulu, Blue, Leona Lewis, Billy Ocean and Jools Holland.
He has appeared on various TV shows like Get your Act Together, The Alan Titchmarsh Show (ITV), The One Show (BBC), BBC Breakfast (BBC), 'Le PLus Grand Cabaret Du Monde' (France 2), This Morning (ITV), The Slammer (CBBC) and Mega Clever - Die NKL-Show.

He toured across UK and the world with his own production of iMagician: The Evolution of magic. iMagician explores the work of the legendary Harry Houdini. Then uses modern technology to bring it into 21st century. Due to this, he is regarded by the media as Houdini of the 21st century.
Inspired by the infamous illusionist and escapologist Harry Houdini, Jamie is Creator and Co-Writer of the musical Houdini and is responsible for overseeing astounding and ground-breaking special effects for the production. He is also responsible for creating a comic strip series of the same name.

He was among the magicians who performed at the grand magical show Impossible.

References

External links 
Official Website

English magicians
1977 births
Living people